Taiwanese singer Jolin Tsai has received many awards and nominations. Tsai has been nominated for a total of 15 Golden Melody Awards, the equivalent to the Grammy Awards in Chinese-speaking world, including two Album of the Year, four Song of the Year, four Best Mandarin Album, four Best Female Mandarin Singer, and one Best Single Producer. She has won a total of seven Golden Melody Awards, including one Album of the Year for her album Ugly Beauty, three Song of the Year for her songs "Marry Me Today", "The Great Artist", and "Womxnly", one Best Mandarin Album for her album Play, and one Best Female Mandarin Singer for her album Dancing Diva. She is the dance-pop artist with the most wins and nominations on the Golden Melody Awards, and the Guinness World Records acknowledged her as the artist with the most wins for Song of the Year on the awards. In 2016, her album Play set the record for the most Golden Melody Award nominations (10 nominations), leading to a tie with Jay Chou's Fantasy (2001) and A-Mei's Amit (2009). In 2018, her album Ugly Beauty was also nominated for eight Golden Melody Award nominations. 

Tsai has received many awards at other Chinese music awards shows, including Beijing Pop Music Awards, CCTV-MTV Music Awards, China Music Awards, Global Chinese Music Awards, Global Chinese Pop Chart Awards, Hito Music Awards, IFPI Hong Kong Top Sales Music Award, KKBox Music Awards, Metro Radio Hits Music Awards, Metro Radio Mandarin Hits Music Awards, Migu Music Awards, Music Radio China Top Chart Awards, My Astro Music Awards, Singapore Hit Awards, Top Chinese Music Awards, Top Ten Chinese Gold Songs Award, and TVB8 Mandarin Music on Demand Awards. Among them, she has received eight Hito Music Awards for Best Female Singer, eight Hito Music Awards for Most Weeks at Number One Album/Song, ten KKBox Music Awards for Top 10 Singers, one Top Chinese Music Award for Most Influential Musicians of the Decade, and one Migu Music Award for Best Female Singer of the Decade. 

Tsai has received awards at international music awards shows, including one MTV Video Music Award for International Viewer's Choice for her music video of "Fall in Love with a Street", one MTV Asia Award for the Style Award, and one Mnet Asian Music Award for Best Asian Artist. She has also received four MTV Asia Award nominations for Favorite Artist Taiwan, one MTV Video Music Award Japan nomination for Best Buzz Asia, one MTV Europe Music Award nomination for Best Asian Act, and one MTV Europe Music award nomination for Best Taiwanese Act. In 2008, Tsai received the Butterfly Award from Taiwan's Ministry of Labor to praise her outstanding performance in the entertainment industry.

Awards and nominations

Notes

References

External links 
 Awards for Jolin Tsai on the Internet Movie Database

Awards
Lists of awards received by Taiwanese musician